The 2009 Vuelta a Murcia was the 25th edition of the Vuelta a Murcia cycle race and was held on 4 March to 8 March 2009. The race started in San Pedro del Pinatar and finished in Murcia. The race was won by Denis Menchov.

General classification

References

2009
2009 in road cycling
2009 in Spanish sport